Spud 3: Learning to Fly is a 2014 South African comedy film written by John van de Ruit, directed by John Barker and starring Troye Sivan, John Cleese and Caspar Lee.  It is the second sequel to the 2010 film Spud following Spud 2: The Madness Continues (2013).  It is based on van de Ruit's novel Spud - Learning to Fly.

Cast
 Troye Sivan as Spud
 John Cleese as The Guv
 Caspar Lee as Garlic
 Sven Ruygrok as Rambo
 Blessing Xaba as Fatty
 Genna Blair as Mermaid
 Travis Hornsby as Boggo
 Aaron McIlroy as Spud's Dad

Production
The film was shot in Cape Town.

Release 
The film was released 15 November 2014 in South Africa. Grossing $327 791 theatrically.

Reception
Radio Times awarded the film two stars out of five.

References

External links
 
 

South African comedy films
Films based on South African novels
Films shot in the Western Cape
2014 comedy films
English-language South African films
2010s English-language films